HNLMS Tonijn (Dutch: Thunnus) was a Potvis-class submarine (modified ) of the Royal Netherlands Navy.

Ship history
The submarine was laid down on 26 October 1962 at the Wilton-Fijenoord shipyard in Schiedam and launched on 14 June 1965. 24 February 1966 she was commissioned in the Dutch navy.

While on exercise northwest of Ireland, she received the news that the submarine Walrus had gone missing. Tonijn participated in the search for the boat on 16 December 1968. It turned out Walrus was not lost but had lost radio contact due to a malfunction.
From 18 to 28 July 1976 Tonijn made a visit to Kiel to  participate in the Kieler Woche. Later that year she visited Dublin from 11 to 14 September.

In September 1979 after fires broke out in the port engine room and starboard engine room  assisted in towing the boat to Gibraltar. The boat was in serious trouble as she also suffered from battery depletion that was performed at the time the fires broke out leaving the boat with 10% battery power. 

On 16 October a refit of the boat began at a dry-docked in Rotterdam. This lasted until 11 December 1979.
The boat made a trip to Norway in 1990 and later that year to Scotland.

On 10 January 1991 the boat was decommissioned. Tonijn is preserved as a museum boat at the Dutch Navy Museum in Den Helder and open to the public since the summer of 1994.

References

1965 ships
Ships built by Wilton-Fijenoord
Dolfijn-class submarines
Museum ships in the Netherlands
Submarines built by Wilton-Fijenoord